"What Have You Got to Lose" is a song written and recorded by American country music artist Tom T. Hall. It was released in August 1978 as the lead single from the album, Places I've Done Time. The song peaked at number 9 on the U.S. country singles chart and at number 14 on the Canadian country singles chart.

Chart performance

References 
 

1978 singles
Tom T. Hall songs
Songs written by Tom T. Hall
1978 songs